Hiromu Yamauchi (山内 大夢, born 24 August 1999) is a Japanese athlete. He competed in the men's 400 metres hurdles event at the 2020 Summer Olympics.

References

External links
 

1999 births
Living people
Japanese male hurdlers
Athletes (track and field) at the 2020 Summer Olympics
Olympic athletes of Japan
People from Aizuwakamatsu
Sportspeople from Fukushima Prefecture